Karol Grzegorz Świderski (born 23 January 1997) is a Polish professional footballer who plays as a striker for Major League Soccer club Charlotte FC and the Poland national team.

Club career

Jagiellonia Białystok
Świderski began his career in the youth academy of Rawia Rawicz. From 2012 to 2014, he was in the sports school of UKS SMS Łódź. Then, in 2014, he went on to play for Ekstraklasa side Jagiellonia Białystok, playing at first in their III Liga team and their youth academy. He eventually started playing exclusively in their first team in the 2016–17 season.

Świderski was only 17 when he made his debut in the Ekstraklasa for Jagiellonia on 23 August 2014, in a 3–1 loss against Śląsk Wrocław. On 3 June 2015, in an away match, he scored his first professional goal against Pogoń Szczecin in the 80th minute, in a 3–1 win.

Świderski's UEFA debut came on 2 July 2015, where he scored and won the game for Jagiellonia in a 1–0 win against Kruoja Pakruojis. He also played in the reverse leg, which Jagiellonia won 8–0 and scored in the 4th minute.

PAOK
On 20 January 2019, PAOK have confirmed the signing of Świderski, penning a 3.5-year contract with the Polish forward on a €2 million transfer fee. He debuted for the club on 27 January 2019, being subbed in the 81st minute for Omar El Kaddouri. On 30 January 2019, Świderski's first goal came in the 87th minute, after coming off the bench for Dimitris Limnios. On 18 February 2019, Świderski scored as a substitute in a 5–1 away win against Apollon Smyrni. On 10 March 2019, he scored in a 3–0 home win against Atromitos. On 21 April 2019, he scored the final goal in a 5–0 defeat of Levadiakos that confirmed PAOKs first league title for 34 years.

On 25 August 2019, he scored his first goal of the 2019–20 season with a header, opening the score, in a 2–1 home win game against Panetolikos, and a week later, he scored again in a 2–1 home win against Panionios. On 29 August, he scored after an assist from Rodrigo Soares as PAOK beat ŠK Slovan Bratislava in the second leg of their Europa League play-off tie but were eliminated on away goals after the score finished 3–3 on aggregate. On 29 September 2019, he scored both PAOK's goals in a 2–2 draw city rivals AEK Athens. On 4 January 2020, the Polish forward gleefully slotted home the rebound after Julián Cuesta clumsily spilled a shot from Dimitris Pelkas, to open the score in an away 4–2 loss against rivals Aris, as PAOK were finally beaten after 51 games in Superleague. On 19 January 2020, Swiderski finished clinically with a low shot on the turn to open the score in a 3–1 home win game against Asteras Tripoli. On 12 February 2020, Świderski received a wonderful pass from Dimitris Pelkas, and the Polish striker subsequently beat Sokratis Dioudis with a pinpoint attempt, helping reigning Greek Cup winners PAOK breezed through to the semi-finals of the Greek Cup, defeating Panathinaikos 1–0 in Athens to complete a 3–0 aggregate triumph.

On 4 October 2020, he scored a brace in the last 3 minutes of the game sealing a triumphiant 3–0 home win against OFI. On 31 January 2021, he scored a brace in a 5–0 home win against Panetolikos.

On 19 January 2022, PAOK accepted MLS club Charlotte FC's €5 million offer for Świderski. Świderski played in 28 matches this season, scoring 4 goals and 3 assists. In his last match with the club, the Polish international striker entered the game as a late substitute, in the derby Greek Cup game against AEK Athens.

Charlotte FC
On 26 January 2022, Charlotte FC announced the signing of Karol Świderski from PAOK to a Designated Player contract through the 2025 season with an option for 2026. The 25-year-old Polish international will occupy an international roster slot on the club’s inaugural roster.

International career

U-18
Świderski was chosen in March 2015 by the Polish U-18 national team coach Rafał Janas to play in the LFF U-18 Federation Cup. He made his debut in the winner's match against Georgia, which Poland won 1–0. Świderski played again and scored his first goal in the 9th minute against Latvia, where they drew 1–1.

U-19
Świderski made his debut for the U-19 team on 5 September 2015 in a friendly against Wales, which ended in a 1–1 draw. He played two friendlies against Slovenia, scoring both the goals in the first match, which ended in a 2–2 draw. He was successful in the U-19 European Championship qualifier in Cyprus against Bulgaria, Cyprus and Luxembourg, scoring 3 goals.

Senior
On 15 March 2021, Świderski was called up for the first time to the national team to play in the 2022 FIFA World Cup qualification. He made his debut in the match against Andorra, being substituted on for Robert Lewandowski in the 63rd minute. He also scored his debut goal for his country in the same game in the 88th minute. He was later included in the Polish squads for the UEFA Euro 2020 and 2022 FIFA World Cup.

Career statistics

Club

International

Scores and results list Poland's goal tally first.

Honours
PAOK
Super League Greece: 2018–19
Greek Cup: 2018–19, 2020–21

References

External links
 
 

1997 births
Living people
Association football forwards
Polish footballers
Poland under-21 international footballers
Poland youth international footballers
Ekstraklasa players
Super League Greece players
Jagiellonia Białystok players
PAOK FC players
Charlotte FC players
Polish expatriate footballers
Expatriate footballers in Greece
Expatriate soccer players in the United States
Polish expatriate sportspeople in Greece
Polish expatriate sportspeople in the United States
People from Rawicz
Sportspeople from Greater Poland Voivodeship
Poland international footballers
UEFA Euro 2020 players
2022 FIFA World Cup players
Designated Players (MLS)
Major League Soccer players